Luisana Pérez Fernández is a Venezuelan-American communications expert and political advisor. She currently serves as the director of Hispanic media for the Joe Biden administration.

Early life and education 
Pérez is a native of Caracas, Venezuela. She earned a Bachelor of Arts degree in international studies from the Central University of Venezuela.

Career 
In 2018, she became involved in the re-election campaign of Democratic Senator Bill Nelson as the Hispanic press secretary and spokesperson. Luisana also served as district director for Florida State Senator José Javier Rodríguez and as deputy director of communications for the Miami-Dade County Mayor's Office, where she collaborated with the integration of Hispanic media in communication plans.

In 2020, she joined the Joe Biden 2020 presidential campaign in Florida, and worked as deputy director of communications for the Florida Democratic Party (FDP) and as director of Hispanic media. Her tasks included designing messages on topics such as the Temporary Protected Status (TPS) for Venezuelans, immigration, and health care. Pérez obtained U.S. citizenship in August 2020, voting for the first time in the 2020 presidential election for Biden.

She subsequently worked as a press secretary and spokesperson for the United States Department of Health and Human Services (HHS) led by Secretary Xavier Becerra, where she collaborated to implement campaigns to improve vaccination rates against the coronavirus among Hispanics and to promote the special enrollment period of the Affordable Care Act (ACA) ordered by Biden in response to the crisis generated by the COVID-19 pandemic.

On 2 September 2021, the White House announced the addition of Luisana to Biden's presidential team as the new director of Hispanic media, replacing Audrey López.

Personal life 
In 2011, Pérez emigrated from Venezuela to the United States, seeking new opportunities. She became an American citizen in 2020.

References 

People from Caracas
Venezuelan emigrants to the United States
Venezuelan women journalists
Biden administration personnel
Year of birth missing (living people)
Living people
Central University of Venezuela alumni